The Communist Party of Canada - Ontario ran a number of candidates in the 1987 provincial election, who were all defeated.  Information about these candidates may be found here.

1987